Mark Paul Michael Turner (born August 1983) is an Australian politician and former Northern Territory Police negotiator. He was elected as the Labor member for the electoral division of Blain in the Northern Territory Legislative Assembly at the 2020 Northern Territory election.

Turner was raised in West London, by his mother (a nurse) and father (an officer in the Metropolitan Police). Turner also served in the Metropolitan Police at the Southall, Ealing and Acton Police Stations before transferring to the Territorial Support Group then emigrating to Australia. He joined the Western Australia Police who had been heavily recruiting officers from the United Kingdom and after serving in the Kimberley Region of Western Australia he moved across the border joining the Northern Territory Police. Turner served in the township of Katherine and several locations around Arnhem Land before being transferred to Darwin after an injury on duty for surgery to reconstruct a tendon in his left hand.

In September 2019, police negotiators Turner and Linda Farrand were awarded the National Police Bravery Award by the Police Federation of Australia for preventing a suicide on Darwin Esplanade.

|}

Later that month, Turner was preselected by the Labor Party to contest the electoral division of Blain at the 2020 Northern Territory general election in August. In November 2019, it was reported that there was an ongoing workers compensation process progressing with the Police, Fire & Emergency Services for worker's compensation of medical costs incurred from the aforementioned tendon ruptured in the line of duty resulting in Turner losing the use of his hand for a number of years whilst undergoing repeated surgery.

At the 2020 election, Turner was elected as the member for Blain, which had previously been held by Territory Alliance leader and former Country Liberal Chief Minister Terry Mills. Turner led the field on the first count, and defeated the CLP candidate collecting about 38% of Mills' preferences despite both Mills and the CLP candidate putting him last on their how to vote cards. He became the first Labor member to hold the seat, which had traditionally been regarded as a CLP stronghold, winning the booths of Bellamack and Rosebery along with the early voting centre and narrowly losing the suburb of Woodroffe.

On 18 February 2021, Turner was expelled from the NT Labor caucus and removed as deputy speaker by chief minister Michael Gunner, following allegations he had engaged in illegal activity during a relationship with a Labor Party staffer. Turner denied any illegal activity but acknowledged an inappropriate relationship. Gunner stated that Turner had "lost my trust. He has lost the trust of the caucus. He is no longer a member of Labor's parliamentary team."

References

1983 births
Living people
Australian Labor Party members of the Northern Territory Legislative Assembly
Australian police officers
Metropolitan Police officers
English emigrants to Australia
21st-century Australian politicians